"Stranded" is a song by American rock band Heart. It was released as the third single from the band's 10th studio album, Brigade (1990). It is a mid-tempo song that features Nancy Wilson on lead vocals. The song was released in the United States in September 1990 and in the United Kingdom two months later.

"Stranded" climbed to number 13 on the US Billboard Hot 100 in 1990. It went to number one in Canada according to The Record and number two according to RPM. In the UK, two editions of the 12-inch single were released: the first came in a gatefold sleeve while the second was issued as a picture disc.

Music video
The music video comes from the perspective of several scenes. In addition to footage from the Brigade Tour, the majority of the video featured Nancy walking alone on the bridge at night to sitting in the living room, and lying on a pile of leaves inside of an empty arena. Howard Leese makes an appearance in the night scene during the solo.

Track listings
7-inch, cassette, and mini-CD single
 "Stranded" – 3:55
 "Under the Sky" – 2:51

US CD single
 "Stranded"
 "The Will to Love"
 "Cruel Tears"

UK 12-inch and CD single
 "Stranded" – 3:55
 "Under the Sky" – 2:51
 "(I'll) Never Stop Loving You" – 3:42
 A picture disc version with the same track listing was also released in the UK.

Charts

Weekly charts

Year-end charts

Release history

References

1990 singles
1990 songs
Capitol Records singles
Heart (band) songs
Song recordings produced by Richie Zito